The Forconi Cup, also called Coupe Edmond Forconi was an Organized in 1942 to 1962, open to all clubs affiliated to the League Algiers Football Association. Regional level as for all Algiers department, the competition to determine the qualified clubs in the area for the North African Cup, inter-regional competition.

The competition, which follows other departmental cuts of the same league, takes place for almost a decade. His editions are paired with the qualifications for the North African Cup and resist the enthusiasm aroused after 1957 the permission of North African clubs to compete in the Coupe de France, as the Algerian Cup in 1957. Finally the cup disappears in 1962 with the independence of Algeria.

Key

Results

Performance by club

See also 
 League Algiers Football Association
 Coupe de France

References

External links 
Algeria - List of Champions - rsssf.com

League Algiers Football Association
Football leagues in Algeria
Alg